List of Stargate episodes may refer to:

List of Stargate SG-1 episodes
List of Stargate Infinity episodes
List of Stargate Atlantis episodes
List of Stargate Universe episodes